Dharmasthala Temple is an 800-year-old Hindu religious institution in the temple town of Dharmasthala in Dakshina Kannada, Karnataka, India. The deities of the temple are Hindu god Shiva, who is referred to as Mañjunatha, Hindu goddess Ammanavaru, the Tirthankara Chandraprabha and the protective gods of Jainism, Kalarahu, Kalarkayi, Kumarasvami and Kanyakumari. The temple was reconsecrated in 16th century by Hindu Dvaita saint Vadiraja Tirtha by the request of the then administrator of the temple, Devaraja Heggade. The temple is considered unique, Since the priests in the temple are Madhwa Brahmins, who are Vaishnava, and the administration is run by a Jain Bunt family called the Pergades.

Legend and origin 
800 years ago, Dharmasthala was known as Kuduma in Mallarmadi, then a village in Belthangady. Here lived the Jain Bunt chieftain Birmanna Pergade and his wife Ammu Ballalthi in a house called Nelliadi Beedu. According to the legend, the guardian angels of Dharma assumed human forms and arrived at Pergade's abode in search of a place where Dharma was being practised and could be continued and propagated. As was their habit, the couple hosted these illustrious visitors with all their wherewithal and great respect. Pleased by their sincerity and generosity, that night the Dharma Daivas appeared in the dreams of Pergade. They explained the purpose of their visit to him and instructed him to vacate his house for the worship of the Daivas and dedicate his life to the propagation of Dharma. Asking no questions, the Pergade built himself another house and began worshiping the Daivas at Nelliadi Beedu.

This worship of daivas continues. The Dharma Daivas again appeared before Pergade to build separate shrines to consecrate the four Daivas – Kalarahu, Kalarkayi, Kumaraswamy and Kanyakumari. Also, Pergade was instructed to choose two persons of noble birth to act as the Daivas' oracles and four worthy persons to assist Pergade in his duties as the executive head of the shrines. In return, the Daivas promised Pergade protection for his family, abundance of charity and renowned for the 'Kshetra'. Pergade, as desired, built the shrines and invited Brahmin priests to perform the rituals. These priests requested Pergade to install a Shivalinga beside the native Daivas. The Daivas then sent their vassal Annappa Swamy to procure the linga of Shiva from Kadri Manjunath Temple, near Mangalore. Subsequently, the Manjunatha temple was built around the linga.

Pergade family 

The Pergade family is a Jain Bunt family who descend from the creator of the temple. Birmanna Pergade and his wife Ammu Ballalthi and are the hereditary trustees of the temple. The eldest male member assumes the position of Dharma Adhikari (chief administrator) and uses the title Heggade. The Heggade was the feudal lord of the temple town and solved civil or criminal disputes. This was a judicial function and continues even to this day: The Heggade sits in judgement on hundreds of civil complaints, known as hoyulu, each day. About nearly twenty generations of the Pergade family have assumed the position of Dharma Adhikari. The present Dharma Adhikari is Veerendra Heggade. The list of previous Dharma Adhikari is as follows:

References

External links 

Official website of Dharmasthala Manjunatha Temple

Hindu temples in Dakshina Kannada district
Shiva temples in Karnataka
13th-century Jain temples

sa:धर्मस्थलम्